Güneybahşiş is a village in Anamur district of Mersin Province, Turkey. The population of Güneybahşiş is 734  as of 2011. The population of the village is composed of Turkmen people.

References

Villages in Anamur District